, often translated as Strange or Mysterious, is the ninth studio album by Japanese singer Akina Nakamori, released on August 11, 1986 through Warner Pioneer.

Background
In February and March 1986 was announced the name of the album along with early track set list. Originally, it was supposed to include promotional single Fin along with its b-side track (they were later released in the mini compilation album CD87). Some tracks had names which were later used in the other studio albums (Akai Mystery in album Cruise and Fire Starter in album Stock). Album track Fushigi was later re-recorded in the mini album Wonder.

In May, inside the single Gypsy Queen was included inquiry letter with the information about the planned release of album in the early July, however due to production issues, the release was postponed on August.

The final official track list was published in June, from previously list only three tracks remained finished during that time: Okibi, Glass no Kokoro, Marionette and Teenage Blue. In 1988, these four tracks were re-recorded and included in the mini album Wonder as well with the difference of clearer vocals and change in arrangements. It's unknown, whenever demo-tape tracks Aoi Twilight Rain and Akage no Sandora, which were included in the earlier track set list, were renamed or completely taken out from the list.

It's Nakamori's first self-produced album. It is something of a concept album in that every track features distorted vocals of some kind (many unsuspecting members of the Japanese public at first thought this to be an unintentional mis-recording).

Stage performance
Before album release, Nakamori performed Back Door Night and Marionette medley in the music television program Yoru no Hit Studio broadcast on 24 July 1986. In 1986 in the live tour Light and Shade, she performed Back Door Night, Marionette, Genwaku Sarete, Glass no Kokoro and New Generation. In 1987 in the live tour A Hundred Days, she performed Wait for me and Mushroom Dance. In 2004 on the live tour I hope so, she performed Okibi and Marionette.

Charting performance
Despite using unique vocal techniques foreign to her fan base, the album proved to sell moderately well, debut at number 1 on Oricon Albums Chart and charted on same position for three consecutive weeks. The album remained at number 16 on the Oricon Album Yearly Charts in 1987.

Reception
Ignatiy Vishnevetsky of The A.V. Club wrote in 2016 that the album is both "forward-thinking and faithful to the slick songwriting formulas of the era’s romantic pop, [...] An uncompromising experiment in soundscape that also happens to be pretty damn catchy, Fushigi is an album best played very loud."

Track listing
All tracks produced by Akina Nakamori.

Notes:
"Back Door Night," "Teen-age Blue" "Wait for Me" and "Mushroom Dance" are stylised in sentence case.

Alternative recordings by Eurox
In 1987, the main sound producer of the album, Eurox self-covered their songs Please Wait for me (Wait for me), Adulation (New Generation) and Dream of (Back Door Night) in their only album Megratrend with renewed arrangement and changed lyrics.

References

1986 albums
Akina Nakamori albums
Japanese-language albums
Warner Music Japan albums
Albums produced by Akina Nakamori